Rachel Rossi (born 1983) is an American lawyer and politician. She has worked as a public defender in Los Angeles County, and as criminal justice counsel to Democratic Senator Dick Durbin and for the United States House Committee on the Judiciary, Subcommittee on Crime, Terrorism and Homeland Security.

Early life and education
Rossi grew up in the San Gabriel Valley region of Southern California. She attended Claremont High School before earning her bachelor's degree from Bethany University and a Juris Doctor from the Pepperdine University School of Law.

Career 
From 2011 to 2019, she was a state and federal public defender in Los Angeles; she has said that defending clients who were generally low-income and minorities, many of whom had suffered homelessness, mental illness or drug abuse, gave her a good understanding of the legal system in Los Angeles.

She then became criminal justice counsel to Dick Durbin, the Democratic Party's Senate Democratic Whip, working on Supreme Court nominations including those of Neil Gorsuch and Brett Kavanaugh. She served as lead staffer on the 2018 First Step Act, which seeks to reduce recidivism and encourages federal prison reform, and has resulted in thousands of prisoners being released. She is Of Counsel to Cohen Williams LLP.

Rossi was then recruited to be Counsel to the United States House Committee on the Judiciary, Subcommittee on Crime, Terrorism and Homeland Security.  She worked with Judiciary Chairman Jerry Nadler and Crime Subcommittee Chair Karen Bass on criminal justice reform legislation and congressional hearings.

In November 2019, Rossi announced she was running as a reformist candidate for Los Angeles County District Attorney. Rossi faced incumbent Jackie Lacey and former San Francisco DA, George Gascón. During her campaign, she has criticized the Los Angeles legal system, pointing out that 80% of prisoners there are black or Latino, and one in three suffers from some form of mental illness.

In November 2020, Rossi was named a member of the Agency Review Team for the Presidential transition of Joe Biden to support transition efforts related to the United States Department of Justice.

Honors 
In 2019 Rossi was recognized by the National Bar Association as one of the United States' top 40 lawyers aged under 40. She has been recognized as a Lawyer of Color during the Congressional Black Caucus Foundation conference.

References

Living people
Pepperdine University School of Law alumni
Bethany University alumni
African-American women lawyers
African-American lawyers
National Bar Association
21st-century African-American people
20th-century African-American people
20th-century African-American women
21st-century African-American women
1983 births